Silver Wheels may refer to two separate music pieces by Heart:

 "Silver Wheels", a track on Heart's 1980 album Bébé le Strange
 Silver Wheels, the opening acoustic intro on Heart's 1975/1976 single "Crazy on You".